Jacob van Gelderen (10 March 1891, Amsterdam – 14 May 1940, The Hague) was a Dutch economist. Alongside Salomon de Wolff, he proposed the existence of 50- to 60-year long economic super cycles, now known as Kondratiev waves.

Van Gelderen became a corresponding member of the Royal Netherlands Academy of Arts and Sciences in 1927, he resigned in 1936.

References

External links
 Biography (Dutch) at www.iisg.nl

1891 births
1940 deaths
Dutch economists
Members of the Royal Netherlands Academy of Arts and Sciences
Writers from Amsterdam